George Burlingame was an American college football player and coach.

University of Virginia
Burlingame was a prominent guard and center for the Virginia Cavaliers football team of the University of Virginia. Burlingame was selected All-Southern in 1895.

Coaching career

Johns Hopkins
Burlingame was the first coach in the history of Johns Hopkins University.

References

Year of birth missing
Year of death missing
19th-century players of American football
American football centers
American football guards
Johns Hopkins Blue Jays football coaches
McDaniel Green Terror football coaches
Virginia Cavaliers football players
All-Southern college football players